Zeradina is a genus of gastropods belonging to the family Vanikoridae.

The species of this genus are found in New Zealand and Northern America.

Species:

Zeradina aculeata 
Zeradina costellata 
Zeradina esculenta 
Zeradina fedosovi 
Zeradina jocelynae 
Zeradina odhneri 
Zeradina ovata 
Zeradina parva 
Zeradina plicifera 
Zeradina producta 
Zeradina translucida

References

Vanikoridae